Senator Negron may refer to:

Joe Negron (born 1961), Florida State Senate
Enrique Rodríguez Negrón (1933–2022), Senate of Puerto Rico